The 1988 United States Senate election in New York was held on November 8, 1988. Incumbent Democratic U.S. Senator Daniel Patrick Moynihan won re-election to a third term in a landslide, versus Republican nominee Robert McMillan. McMillan, who ran a "low-budget" challenge to the two-term Senator, was largely ignored by Moynihan in the public sphere.

Major candidates

Democratic nomination

Nominee 
 Daniel Patrick Moynihan, incumbent U.S. Senator since 1977

Republican nomination 
Lewis Lehrman, a businessman who narrowly lost to Mario Cuomo in the 1982 gubernatorial election, was speculated to mount a run against Moynihan. However, he did not end up mounting a bid for Senate. With no major Republican willing to challenge Moynihan, the party acclaimed businessman Robert McMillan as its nominee.

Nominee 
 Robert R. McMillan, business executive of Avon Products and Reagan Administration adviser

Results

See also 
  1988 United States Senate elections

References 

New York
1988
1988 New York (state) elections